The 1908 South Sydney season was the first in the club's history. They competed in the New South Wales Rugby Football League (NSWRFL) Premiership, finishing as the inaugural Australian rugby league premiers.

Ladder 

 Cumberland deducted 2 points due to late entry into the competition.

Fixtures

Regular season

Finals

Statistics

References 

South Sydney Rabbitohs seasons
South Sydney Rabbitohs season